Pherecydes of Athens (fl. c. 465 BC), described as an historian and genealogist, wrote an ancient work in ten books, now lost, variously titled "Historiai" (Ἱστορίαι) or "Genealogicai" (Γενελογίαι). He is one of the authors (= FGrHist 3) whose fragments were collected in Felix Jacoby's Die Fragmente der griechischen Historiker.

He is generally thought to be different from the sixth-century Pre-Socratic philosopher Pherecydes of Syros, who was sometimes mentioned as one of the Seven Sages of Greece and was reputed to have been the teacher of Pythagoras. Although the Suda considers them separately, he is possibly the same person as Pherecydes of Leros.

Notes

References
 Bollansée, Jan, "Hermippos of Smyrna" in Die Fragmente Der Griechischen Historiker, Continued, Part Four, Biography and Antiquarian Literature Edited by G. Schepens, BRILL, 1999. .
 Fowler, Robert L. (1999), "The Authors named Pherecydes", Mnemosyne, Fourth Series, Vol. 52, Fasc. 1 (Feb., 1999), pp. 1-15. .
 Fowler, Robert. L. (2000), Early Greek Mythography: Volume 1: Text and Introduction, Oxford University Press, 2000. .
 Fowler, Robert. L. (2013), Early Greek Mythography: Volume 2: Commentary, Oxford University Press, 2013. .
 Gantz, Timothy, Early Greek Myth: A Guide to Literary and Artistic Sources, Johns Hopkins University Press, 1996, Two volumes:  (Vol. 1),  (Vol. 2).
 Hawes, Greta, Myths on the Map: The Storied Landscapes of Ancient Greece, Oxford University Press, 2017. .
 Huxley, George, "The Date of Pherekydes of Athens", Greek, Roman and Byzantine Studies 14 (1973:137–43).
 Jacoby, F., "The First Athenian Prose Writer", in Mnemosyne, Third Series, Vol. 13, Fasc. 1 (1947), pp. 13-64. .
 Purves, Alex C., Space and Time in Ancient Greek Narrative, Cambridge University Press, 2010. .

Ancient Athenian historians
5th-century BC historians
Year of birth unknown
Year of death unknown